The Denis Ten Memorial Challenge is an annual senior and junior-level figure skating competition series in Almaty or Nur-Sultan, Kazakhstan, organized by the Denis Ten Foundation. Named in honor of 2014 Olympic bronze medalist Denis Ten, the competition was first held in 2019. The competition is scheduled to be part of the ISU Challenger Series.

Senior results

Men

Women

Pairs

Ice dance

Junior results

Men

Women

Ice dance

References

External links
 2019 Denis Ten Memorial Challenge at the International Skating Union

 
International figure skating competitions hosted by Kazakhstan
Sports competitions in Almaty
ISU Challenger Series